= Le Deunff =

- Pronunciation: pronounced [lœ dœ̃w]

Origin
- Origin: Breton
- Meaning: son-in-law
- Region of origin: Brittany

Other names
- Variant forms: Le Deunf, Le Deuf, Le Deuff, Le Doeuf, Le Doeuff, Le Dunf, Le Dunff, Le Dun, Ledeun

Le Deunff or Le Deunf is a surname deriving from the Breton "deuñv" (cf. Deuñv), meaning son-in-law and related to welsh daw.

Le Deunff may refer to:

- David Le Deunff - French singer-songwriter
